The FIA Hall of Fame honours racing drivers. It was established by the Fédération Internationale de l'Automobile (FIA) in 2017. The first inductees were the 33 Formula One world champions, followed by the 17 World Rally champions and the 28 World Endurance champions in 2019.

Inductees into the Hall of Fame

Inaugural class (2017)

Class of 2018

Class of 2019

References

External links
FIA Hall of Fame official webpage

Hall of Fame
Formula One
Auto racing museums and halls of fame